Aizopsis is a genus of the succulent family Crassulaceae (stonecrop family), found in east Asia.

Description 

Flowers yellow, chromosome numbers, x=16.

Taxonomy 

In 1978, Ohba divided up the very large and cosmopolitan genus Sedum, placing S. aizoon  and allied species into S. subgenus Aizoon. In 1995, he segregated these species into a separate genus, Aizopsis. However, other authors included these species in another segregate, Phedimus, as subgenus Aizoon. Subsequent molecular phylogenetic analysis established Aizopsis as a sister group to Phedimus, which with distinguishing characteristics justified their retention as a separate genus, although the distinction has not been universally adopted.

Distribution 

East Asia

References

Bibliography 

 
  (full text at ResearchGate)
 
 
 , in 
 
 , in 
 

Crassulaceae
Crassulaceae genera